Wayne Sandilands (born 23 August 1983 in Benoni, Gauteng) is a former South African professional soccer player who last played as a goalkeeper for Orlando Pirates in the Dstv Premier Soccer League.

Honours 

Supersport United

• MTN 8

Winners : 2004

• Nedbank Cup

Winners : 2005

Platinum Stars

• Premier Soccer League

Runners up :2006/2007

• Telkom Knockout

Winners: 2006

Mamelodi Sundowns:

 Premier Soccer League : 2013/14, 2015/16
 Nedbank Cup : 2014/15
 Telkom Knockout : 2015
 CAF Champions League : 2016
 CAF Super Cup : 2017

Orlando pirates

• Premier Soccer League

Runners up : 2017/2018, 2018/2019

• Telkom knockout

Runners up : 2018

• MTN 8

Winners : 2020

References

External links
 

1983 births
South African soccer players
Living people
SuperSport United F.C. players
Platinum Stars F.C. players
People from Benoni
White South African people
South African people of Scottish descent
Association football goalkeepers
Mamelodi Sundowns F.C. players
South Africa international soccer players
2013 Africa Cup of Nations players
Sportspeople from Gauteng